aPriori Capital Partners  is a private equity investment firm focused on leveraged buyout transactions. The firm was founded as an affiliate of Credit Suisse and traces its roots to Donaldson, Lufkin & Jenrette, the investment bank acquired by Credit Suisse First Boston in 2000. 
The private equity arm also manages a group of investment vehicles including Real Estate Private Equity, International Private Equity, Growth capital, Mezzanine debt, Infrastructure, Energy and Commodities Focused, fund of funds, and Secondary Investments.

aPriori has offices in New York, London, Los Angeles, and Detroit.

History
DLJMB (named for "Donaldson, Lufkin & Jenrette Merchant Banking") was founded in 1985 to invest capital in leveraged buyouts alongside private equity firms that were DLJ clients, off of the bank's balance sheet as well as capital contributed by employees.  In 1992, the firm raised its first institutional private equity fund (DLJ Merchant Banking Partners, LP) with $1 billion in investor commitments. In 1997, the firm raised its second fund with $3 billion in investor commitments and three years later in 2000 raised its largest fund to date at $5.3 billion.

After the acquisition of DLJ, the group, which was led by Thompson Dean and Larry Schloss faced significant turnover.  In 2004, DLJMB co-head Larry Schloss, completed a spinout from DLJMB to form a new private equity firm, Diamond Castle Holdings.  The following year, in 2005, a team of professionals, led by Thompson Dean and Steven Webster, completed a spinout of DLJMB to form a new private equity firm, Avista Capital Partners, which raised its own $2 billion fund in 2007.

Six years after its previous fund, in 2006, the firm was able to raise $2.1 billion in investor commitments for DLJ Merchant Banking Partners IV, LP—more than doubling the $1.0 billion the company was reportedly seeking due to high investor interest. The firm is reportedly seeking to raise its fifth fund in 2009–2010, which targets $3.5 billion in investor commitments.

In 2008, Nicole Arnaboldi was named head of the firm after Steven C. Rattner resigned in the middle of fundraising for its fifth fund.

In 2014, DLJMB was spun out as aPriori Capital Partners.

Examples of Current and Prior Investments
Neiman Marcus — Specialty retailer of apparel and accessories
MGM — Producer of motion pictures, TV programming, and other media, music, and merchandise
Advanstar — Provider of marketing solutions for business professionals and consumers
 Accellent — Provider of manufacturing and design services to medical device makers
HealthMarkets — Life and health insurance company
Nuveen Investments — Investment management and financial services company
Rockwood Holdings — Manufacturer of specialty chemicals and materials
Geokinetics — Provider of seismic data services
Symetra Financial — Life and health insurance company
NIBC Bank — Asset management and financial services firm
Education and Adventure Travel Group — UK travel packager for school-children
Guala Closures Group — Manufacturer of closures for consumer products and industrial companies
Den-Mat Holdings — Producer of cosmetic and restorative dental products
Wastequip — Manufacturer of waste management equipment and products
Deffenbaugh Industries — Environmental and facilities services company
Specialized Technology Resources — Manufacturer of solar encapsulants, for the photovoltaic solar module industry & provider of quality assurance services for general consumer merchandise.
RathGibson — Manufacturer of industrial and machinery products
Total Safety U.S. — Provider of safety service solutions to the industrial markets

See also

Diamond Castle Holdings

Notable current and former employees
Steven C. Rattner

References

Private equity firms of the United States
Investment banking private equity groups
Financial services companies based in New York City
American companies established in 1985
Financial services companies established in 1985
1985 establishments in New York (state)
Credit Suisse